is a Japanese artist, sculptor, floral artist, nature art artist, land art artist and environmental artist. He exhibits regularly both in Japan and internationally. Since 1992, he has mainly worked on scenography. He brought a floral design representation in area of contemporary art. His daughter, Memi, is a former member of Japanese idol group Hinatazaka46.

Biography 
Kakizaki was born in Nagano, Japan and has been a floral designer since 1990. His first solo exhibition was in 2003, the same year he won TV Tokyo's National Florist Championship in the programme TV Champion.

Early career
Kakizaki's design career started with a job at Serendipity Design in Tokyo where he worked on films, television programmes, and promotional videos. In 1992 his floral art exhibition "Flower and green for the town" was held at Yagihashi department store. This exhibition was done to commemorate 95 years since the establishment of the store in Kumagaya City, Saitama Prefecture. In 1993 he became an assistant to Interflora World Cup champion Fumihiko Muramatsu in Shizuoka City. In 1995 he took part in the Hase-dera art project in Nagano and then took charge of the stage decorations of a concert of many artists, including Eiichi Arai, Shonosuke Okura, Lee Jeongmi, Lebun Kamuy, Hasbaator, Un-Ryu, and the members of Kodo.

Scenography utilizing flower design for butoh dance performances
He designed scenography utilizing flower design for the butoh performances the "Kazuo Ohno Butoh at Hasedera" by Kazuo Ohno and Yoshito Ohno (1999) and "Kazuo Ohno Butoh at Hasedera 2000" by Kazuo Ohno and conceptual artist Yutaka Matsuzawa (2000). In 2002 he was part of a team responsible for the floral designs for "2 New Dance Pieces" by the Richard Hart's Guren Dance Theater. He founded Floridance with Hart in the same year. Foridance has performed many times, mainly in Nagano. He designed the scenography for the butoh dance production "New Life", commissioned by Swedish king and the city of Uppsala, performed at Vaksala torg in Uppsala, Sweden and Swedish Embassy in Roppongi, Tokyo (2007).

Photo books 
 "METAPHOR"　Publisher: Twins Lion Do,　Author: Junichi Kakizaki, 　Photo: Junichi Kakizaki / Joji Okamoto, 　(21/06/2019),　ISBN 978-4990928384 / ISBN 4990928385,　(English / Japanese, Bilingual)
 "NEW LIFE - Quickening from the Cradle" = Atarashii seimei: Yurikago karano taidō = New Life: Yurikago karano taidō,　Publisher: Kyuryudo art publishing,　Author: Junichi Kakizaki,　Photo: Junichi Kakizaki / Joji Okamoto,　(2007/09/26),　ISBN 9784763007285 /  ISBN 978-4763007285,　(Japanese / English, bilingual)

References

External links
 English:
 JUNICHI KAKIZAKI Official Website "KURUIZAKI"  
 SU-EN Butoh Company Official Website - FRAGRANT  
 CHANGa Art Gallery AG. - JUNICHI KAKIZAKI  
 Linnaeus 2007 "New Life" - Linnaeus Gala Event　
 Japanese:
 JUNICHI KAKIZAKI Official Website "KURUIZAKI"  
 SEIBUNDO.net Florist Magazine Official Website
 The  Artists organization - JUNICHI KAKIZAKI

See also
 List of Japanese artists

1971 births
Florists
Flower artists
Japanese contemporary artists
20th-century Japanese botanists
Kadōka
Living people
People from Nagano (city)
21st-century Japanese botanists